Susan Lee (née French, born 7 May 1960) is a Canadian former long-distance runner. She competed in the 3000 metres at the 1984 Los Angeles Olympics and went on to finish eighth in the 10,000 metres final at the 1988 Seoul Olympics. She also competed at the Commonwealth Games in 1986 and 1990.

International competitions

References

External links
 
 
 
 
 
 

1960 births
Living people
Athletes (track and field) at the 1984 Summer Olympics
Athletes (track and field) at the 1988 Summer Olympics
Canadian female long-distance runners
Olympic track and field athletes of Canada
Athletes (track and field) at the 1986 Commonwealth Games
Athletes (track and field) at the 1990 Commonwealth Games
Commonwealth Games competitors for Canada
Athletes (track and field) at the 1987 Pan American Games
Pan American Games track and field athletes for Canada
World Athletics Championships athletes for Canada
Place of birth missing (living people)